The original church penitentiary for the reclamation of fallen women was founded in 1806 in London. There  most well known centre was set up by former British prime minister William Ewart Gladstone in 1848. Its aim was the convent-based rehabilitation of women, including prostitutes, thieves, the homeless, alcoholics etc. They were charitable organisations and not in place for the punishment of crimes.

The Church Penitentiary Association existed from 1852 until 1951. There are records on the association in the Library at Lambeth Palace, the seat of the Archbishop of Canterbury in London, and in the National Archives.

These also have holdings on related societies such as the Navvy Mission Society (now Industrial Christian Fellowship), the Temperance Council of the Christian Churches (now the Churches Council on Alcohol and Drugs) the Church of England Council for Social Aid, the Band of Hope (1855–1990), and the Church Moral Aid Society (1852–1892).

Rescue work for unmarried mothers: 

An example of a nonconformist institution of this kind is the Manchester and Salford Asylum for female penitents, Embden Place Greenheys.

See also
Drug rehabilitation
Homelessness
Occupational therapy
Penology
Prostitution
Rehabilitation (penology)

References

 Prostitution: Prevention and Reform in England, 1860–1914 by Paula Bartle; London: Routledge, 1999; pp. i–xi, 1–229

Social welfare charities based in the United Kingdom
 Women's prisons
 1806 in England
19th century in England
 Criminal justice
 Women in history
 Patriarchy
 Prostitution law